Eskihisar (literally "old fortress" in Turkish) may refer to the following places in Turkey :

 Bolu, capital of the northern province of Bolu, Ancient Claudiopolis (in Honoriade)
 Eskihisar, Denizli, a village in the central (Denizli) district of Denizli Province
 Eskihisar, Elmalı, a village in the district of Elmalı, Antalya Province
 Eskihisar, Sultanhisar, a village in the district of Sultanhisar, Aydın Province
 Yeni Eskihisar, a stratigraphic formation in Yatağan, Muğla Province